is a Shinto shrine located in the city of Gifu, Gifu Prefecture, Japan. First built in 135, it has long been considered a place to pray for financial blessings. Because it is located near the city center, approximately 150,000 worshippers visit the shrine over the three-day New Year's period. On April 5, the shrine hosts the Gifu Festival with Inaba Shrine and Kashimori Shrine. The nearby Kogane Hall can be used as a communications place for the citizens of the city.

History
The shrine was destroyed by the Mino–Owari earthquake in 1891, and was rebuilt 14 years later in 1905. However, it was again destroyed in 1945 during air raids during World War II, and was again rebuilt in 1958. The current structure was built in 1988.

Enshrined god
The Nunoshihime-no-mikoto goddess is worshipped here. She is the wife of the Inishiki-Irihiko-no-mikoto god (Inaba Shrine) and the mother of the Ichihaya-no-mikoto god (Kashimori Shrine). Because of the family connection between their three gods, these three shrines have a very close relationship.

Kogane Park
Kogane Park (金公園 Kogane Kōen) is a large park located to the south of Kogane Shrine. The park holds the Gifu City Culture Center, an old streetcar that used to run through the city, a children's play area, and other features.

References

Images 

Buildings and structures in Gifu
Shinto shrines in Gifu Prefecture